Catch Us If You Can (released as Having a Wild Weekend in the U.S.) was the 1965 feature-film debut of director John Boorman. It was designed as a vehicle for pop band the Dave Clark Five, whose popularity at the time rivaled that of the Beatles, and is named after their hit song "Catch Us If You Can".

Plot
The five are living together in a London flat. They make breakfast then drive to Smithfield Market, passing multiple advertising posters featuring a girl and the slogan "Meat for Go".

During the filming of a TV commercial for a "Meat for Go" campaign set in London's Smithfield Market, stuntman Steve (Dave Clark), disillusioned by the inanity of his job, absconds in an E-type Jaguar (260 EYW, one of the props) with a young actress/model, Dinah (Barbara Ferris). After a visit to Oasis Swimming Pools, an open-air swimming pool in central London, and a scene in and around the Great Conservatory on the grounds of Syon House, they make their way across a wintry southern England toward Burgh Island, off the coast of Devon. Dinah is contemplating buying the island, presumably to escape the pressures of her celebrity as the "Butcher Girl" in the TV meat advertising campaign. This act of rebellion is cynically exploited by the advertising executive behind the campaign, Leon Zissell (David de Keyser), who dispatches two of his henchmen to pursue the fleeing couple.

On their journey, Steve and Dinah first encounter a group of beatniks squatting in MOD-owned buildings on Salisbury Plain (some of this sequence was shot in the evacuated village of Imber), and then, an eccentric, upper-class, middle-aged married couple (Yootha Joyce and Robin Bailey) in the opulent surroundings of the Royal Crescent in Bath, Somerset. Steve also plans to visit his boyhood hero, Louie (David Lodge), whose youth club in London's East End he attended, and who has since relocated to Devon.

Having fled the police and Zissell's henchmen after a fancy-dress party in the Roman Baths at Bath, Steve and Dinah (with the rest of Steve's gang and the police in pursuit) make their way toward Devon. Louie recognises Dinah instantly because of her TV celebrity, but fails to recognise Steve and misremembers his name, even after being introduced. Dinah's island also proves to be disappointing; at low tide, it is reachable from the mainland, and Zissell, who is besotted with Dinah, has already arrived.

Themes
Although they perform the off-screen soundtrack music, the Dave Clark Five (unlike the Beatles in their films) do not portray themselves but appear to be a team of freelance stuntmen/extras led by the saturnine Steve (Dave Clark). Clark had worked as a stuntman on several films, which appears to have provided him with a level of cinematic experience and camera sense rare for a pop artist of the time. The other four members of the band perform under their real first names, but have comparably minor parts.

The film is less of a conventional pop vehicle than one dealing with the frailty of personal relationships, the flimsiness of dreams and the difficulty of maintaining spontaneity, authenticity, and integrity in a stage-managed "society of the spectacle." Boorman's debut film drew favourable notices from Pauline Kael and Dilys Powell, as it captured much of the cultural energy of the time.

Production notes
In a running gag, Lenny Davidson is the only member of the Dave Clark Five who does not utter a single word in the film, usually because the others do not let him talk. He comes dressed as Harpo Marx to the Arts Ball party (until Dinah switches costumes with him to avoid being caught by the police and her bosses; this is evident not only in the film but also on the back cover of the soundtrack album).

Marianne Faithfull rejected the role of Dinah as being "too poppy."

Denis Payton's last name is misspelled as "Paynton" in the opening and closing credits.

A still image of Yootha Joyce from the film was used as sleeve art on the singles "Ask" and "Some Girls Are Bigger Than Others" by the English rock band the Smiths.

Release 
At an appearance in Paterson, New Jersey, during the Dave Clark Five's promotional tour for the film, the band's business manager and a bodyguard were arrested after assaulting a police officer; the scuffle began when police told the band's fifteen uniformed guards to stop hitting teenage fans who had been rushing the stage. At an appearance at the Branford Theater in Newark, New Jersey, more than 1,100 fans created bedlam by stamping on the floor, standing on their seats and screaming. A similar reaction occurred when the band visited a Queens cinema to promote the film, with more than 5,000 fans breaking through barricades to reach the band members, causing policemen at the scene to call for reinforcements.

Reception 
New York Times reviewer Bosley Crowther praised the film as an "obvious but strangely haunting romance" and a "fresh and fetching British film" in a contemporaneous review. Writing in the Ottawa Citizen, reviewer Gordon Stoneham wrote: "Having a Wild Weekend is a rather odd vehicle to spotlight a group of teen-age idols, but, on the other hand, it shows them in a new and quite pleasant light."

Soundtrack
Of the twelve tracks on the U.S. soundtrack album (Epic 24162/26162), only four are from the film: "Having a Wild Weekend", "Catch Us If You Can", "Sweet Memories" and "On the Move".  The remainder of songs used in the film were from previous albums, including "Time" (from Glad All Over), "Move On" and "Ol' Sol" (from American Tour), and "When" and "I Can't Stand It" (from Coast to Coast).

References

External links

 
 Reel Streets:Catch Us If You Can

1965 films
1960s musical comedy-drama films
British musical comedy-drama films
1960s road comedy-drama films
1960s English-language films
British road comedy-drama films
Films directed by John Boorman
The Dave Clark Five
1960s chase films
British chase films
Jukebox musical films
Warner Bros. films
Films scored by Basil Kirchin
1965 directorial debut films
1965 comedy films
1965 drama films
1960s British films